Rick C. West (born 3 December 1951) is a Canadian arachnologist and an expert on the taxonomy of tarantula spiders. West was born in Victoria, British Columbia. He has been interested in spiders since childhood, and collected his first tarantula, Aphonopelma eutylenum, at the age of 13. He worked primarily as a Chief Constable for a local Animal Humane Society, but also have been involved with the collecting, breeding, rearing and photography of theraphosid spiders. West has traveled to over 27 countries to document and study them in their environment, has been a host, presenter and co-producer in several tarantula documentaries and has also described several genera and species.

Described theraphosid taxa 

Genera
Antikuna Kaderka, Ferretti, West, Lüddecke & Hüsser, 2021
Crassicrus Reichling & West, 1996
Psednocnemis West, Nunn & Hogg, 2012 
Species
Antikuna urayrumi Ferretti, Kaderka & West, in Kaderka et al., 2021
Antikuna valladaresi Ferretti, Kaderka & West, in Kaderka et al., 2021
Bistriopelma kiwicha Nicoletta, Chaparro, Mamani, Ochoa, West & Ferretti, 2020
Bistriopelma peyoi Nicoletta, Chaparro, Mamani, Ochoa, West & Ferretti, 2020
Chinchaysuyu spinosa Ferretti, Chaparro, Ochoa & West, 2023
Citharacanthus meermani Reichling & West, 2000
Coremiocnemis hoggi West & Nunn, 2010
Coremiocnemis kotacana West & Nunn, 2010
Coremiocnemis obscura West & Nunn, 2010
Crassicrus lamanai Reichling & West, 1996
Cyclosternum palomeranum West, 2000
Ephebopus cyanognathus West & Marshall, 2000
Ephebopus foliatus West, Marshall, Fukushima & Bertani, 2008
Ephebopus rufescens West & Marshall, 2000
Hapalotremus apasanka Sherwood, Ferretti, Gabriel & West, 2021
Hapalotremus carabaya Ferretti, Cavallo, Chaparro, Ríos-Tamayo, Seimon & West, 2018
Hapalotremus chasqui Ferretti, Cavallo, Chaparro, Ríos-Tamayo, Seimon & West, 2018
Hapalotremus chespiritoi Ferretti, Cavallo, Chaparro, Ríos-Tamayo, Seimon & West, 2018
Hapalotremus hananqheswa Sherwood, Ferretti, Gabriel & West, 2021
Hapalotremus kaderkai Sherwood, Ferretti, Gabriel & West, 2021
Hapalotremus kuka Ferretti, Cavallo, Chaparro, Ríos-Tamayo, Seimon & West, 2018
Hapalotremus marcapata Ferretti, Cavallo, Chaparro, Ríos-Tamayo, Seimon & West, 2018
Hapalotremus perezmilesi Ferretti, Cavallo, Chaparro, Ríos-Tamayo, Seimon & West, 2018
Hapalotremus vilcanota Ferretti, Cavallo, Chaparro, Ríos-Tamayo, Seimon & West, 2018
Hapalotremus yuraqchanka Sherwood, Ferretti, Gabriel & West, 2021
Ischnocolus vanandelae Montemor, West & Zamani, 2020
Lyrognathus achilles West & Nunn, 2010
Lyrognathus fuscus West & Nunn, 2010
Lyrognathus giannisposatoi Nunn & West, 2013
Lyrognathus lessunda West & Nunn, 2010
Lyrognathus liewi West, 1991 (synonymous with Lyrognathus robustus Smith, 1988)
Magnacarina aldana (West, 2000)
Phlogiellus bogadeki Nunn, West & von Wirth, 2016
Phlogiellus johnreylazoi Nunn, West & von Wirth, 2016
Phlogiellus moniqueverdezae Nunn, West & von Wirth, 2016
Phlogiellus pelidnus Nunn, West & von Wirth, 2016
Psednocnemis brachyramosa (West & Nunn, 2010)
Psednocnemis davidgohi West, Nunn & Hogg, 2012
Psednocnemis gnathospina (West & Nunn, 2010)
Psednocnemis jeremyhuffi (West & Nunn, 2010)
Tmesiphantes intiyaykuy Nicoletta, Ferretti, Chaparro & West, 2022

Eponymous Taxa 
Species
Aelurillus westi Azarkina & Zamani, 2019 (Salticidae)
Antillena rickwesti (Bertani & Huff, 2013) (Theraphosidae)
Melloina rickwesti Raven, 1999 (Paratropididae)
Phoneyusa westi Smith, 1990 (Theraphosidae)

Filmography

Selected publications 
A new tarantula (Mygalomorphae: Theraphosidae) genus endemic from Peru with a novel genitalic morphology among theraphosinae and its phylogenetic placement. Zoologischer Anzeiger 302: 102-112.
First record of Tmesiphantes Simon, 1892 (Araneae: Theraphosidae) in Peru: a new species and its phylogenetic placement. Anais da Academia Brasileira de Ciências 94(4, e20200702): 1-17.
Antikuna, a new genus with seven new species from Peru (Araneae: Theraphosidae: Theraphosinae) and the highest altitude record for the family. Journal of Natural History 55(21-22): 1335-1402.
Two new endemic species of Bistriopelma (Araneae: Theraphosidae) from Peru, including a new remarkable horned tarantula. European Journal of Taxonomy 644: 1-20.
The Neotropical genus Hapalotremus Simon, 1903 (Araneae: Theraphosidae), with the description of seven new species and the highest altitude record for the family. Journal of Natural History 52(29-30): 1927-1984.
Redescription of the theraphosine Hapalotremus albipes Simon, 1903 and description of four new species of Hapalotremus Simon, 1903 from Peru and Bolivia (Araneae: Theraphosidae). Arachnology 18(9): 965-989.
Taxonomy of the genus Ischnocolus in the Middle East, with description of a new species from Oman and Iran (Araneae: Theraphosidae). Zoology in the Middle East 66(1): 76-90.
 ,  &  (2016): A revision of the selenocosmiine tarantula genus Phlogiellus Pocock 1897 (Araneae: Theraphosidae), with description of 4 new species. International Journal of Zoology 2016(9895234) Full Text
 ,  &  (2012): A new tarantula genus, Psednocnemis, from west Malaysia (Araneae: Theraphosidae), with cladistic analysis and biogeography of Selenocosmiinae Simon 1889. Zootaxa 3299 Abstract
  &  (2010): A taxonomic revision of the tarantula spider genus Coremiocnemis Simon 1892 (Araneae, Theraphosidae), with further notes on the Selenocosmiinae. Zootaxa 2443 Abstract
  &  (2010): A taxonomic revision of the tarantula spider genus Lyrognathus Pocock 1895 (Araneae, Theraphosidae), with notes on the Selenocosmiinae. Zootaxa 2362 Abstract
Zootaxa 1849 Abstract
  &  (2000). A new species of tarantula spider (Araneae, Mygalomorphae, Theraphosidae) from the Cayo District of Belize. The Southwestern Naturalist 45: 128-132.
  (2000). Some new theraphosids from western Mexico (Araneae, Mygalomorphae). The Southwestern Naturalist 45: 299-305.
  &  (1996). A new genus and species of theraphosid spider from Belize (Araneae, Theraphosidae). Journal of Arachnology 24: 254-261.

References

External links 
 Birdspiders
 World Spider Catalog

1951 births
Arachnologists
Living people
People from Victoria, British Columbia